The Greatest Hits on Earth is the second compilation and first greatest hits album by Swedish industrial metal band Deathstars, released on 4 November 2011 in Europe via Nuclear Blast records. The album was released in celebration of being selected as a support band of Rammstein for the first two legs of their Made in Germany tour. There are also two new tracks, Metal, which was accompanied by a music video, and Death Is Wasted On The Dead.

Track listing

References 

2011 compilation albums
Deathstars albums
Nuclear Blast compilation albums